Curimus is a Finnish thrash / death metal band formed in 2004.

History
The original line-up included Juha-Matti Helmi (guitar), Jucca Ääri (drums) and Jarno Ääri (bass). Marko Silvennoinen (vocals) joined the band in the same year. The first demo was released in 2006. It included the song "Fatal Belief" which was also released as a music video. Juho Manninen replaced Jarno Ääri and the second demo "Under My Skin" was released in 2008. The line-up stayed the same until 2009. After the release of third demo "Humanity... for Sale" Jari Nieminen joined the band replacing Jucca Ääri. The fourth demo "Values" was released in 2010 and it got really good response. Finland's biggest metal webzine Imperiumi.net gave the EP 5/5 point cerifying it as a "demo of the month".

On February 22, 2012 Curimus released their first full-length album Realization via their own label Freezin Penguin, distributed by Inverse Records. The album hit the charts in its release week at position 6 in record store list and position 29 in Finland's official chart.

On April 25, 2014 band released their second album Artificial Revolution. Again by their own label but this time distributed by Svart Records. This album preceded the digital singles "Preachings" (including guest vocals by Aleksi Hahko) and "Reincarnation", which was also released as a music video by Esa Jussila and Artturi Rostén.

Touring
Curimus has always been an active tour band. During its career they have played over a 100 shows in Finland, Russia and Estonia.

Other
Curimus is also known for their media raptures. In 2012 they gave away free condoms. On the package the band posed completely naked, only instruments covering their private parts.

Discography

Albums
Artificial Revolution
 Reincarnation
 Free-standing Nation
 No Feast for the Vultures
 Faith & Obsession
 Love Song
 In the Darkness
 Blade In / Blood Out
 Unchained
 Preachings
 Depraved
 Born Yesterday

 Release date: April 25, 2014
 Label: Freezing Penguin
 Distributor: Svart Records
 Produced by Tom Gardiner and Curimus
 Co-produced, recorded & mixed by Daniel Rantanen at JR Audio Studios
 Drums recorded by Daniel Rantanen at Electric Fox Studios/Gallopy Sounds | Assisted by Teemu Laukkanen
 Vocals recorded by Janne Lukka at Studio Disharmony
 Mastered by Mika Jussila at Finnvox

Realization
 Reset
 Force-Fed
 Inhuman Nature
 Restraint
 Payback
 Addicted
 Hall of Insane
 Shepherd
 Crusade
 Welcome and Goodbye
 Resigned Eyes

 Release year: 2012
 Label: Freezing Penguin
 Distributor: Inverse Records
 Recorded at Ansa-Studio, Ulvila by Jori Haukio
 Mastered at Finnvox Oy, Helsinki by Mika Jussila

Demos
Values
 Values of Destruction
 Here Comes the Pain
 Addicted

 Release year: 2010

Humanity... for Sale!
 Havoc Mind
 Masked Reality
 Bleeding for Nothing

 Release year: 2009

Under My Skin
 Under My Skin
 Something You Cannot Be
 Creature
 Tomorrow

 Release year: 2008

Promo
 Fatal Belief
 Break of the Human Race

 Release year: 2006

Members
 Marko Silvennoinen – vocals (2005–present)
 Juha-Matti Helmi – guitars (2004–present)
 Juho Manninen – bass (2005–present)
 Jari Nieminen – drums (2009–present)

Former members:
 Jarno Ääri – bass (2004–2005)
 Jucca Ääri – drums (2004–2009)

References

Values review: http://www.imperiumi.net/index.php?act=demos&id=2491
Finnish chart: http://ifpi.fi/tilastot/virallinen-lista/artistit/curimus
Media article about the condoms: http://www.inferno.fi/uutiset/kesan-hittituote-curimus-nelikko-painatti-oman-alastonkuvansa-kondomipaketteihin/

Finnish death metal musical groups
Finnish thrash metal musical groups
Musical groups established in 2004